In Roman religion, Tutelina was an agricultural goddess who was responsible for protecting crops brought in during harvest time. Tutelina and two other harvesting goddesses, Messia and Secia, had three pillars with altars before them in the Circus Maximus.

See also
Ceres (mythology)

References

External links
 Myth Index - Tutelina

Roman goddesses
Agricultural goddesses